Querétaro Fútbol Club Femenil is a Mexican women's football club based in Querétaro, Querétaro. The club has been the female section of Querétaro F.C. since 2017. The team currently plays in the Liga MX Femenil which started in July 2017.

Personnel

Coaching staff

Players

Current squad
As of 16 July 2021

References

Liga MX Femenil teams
Association football clubs established in 2017
Women's association football clubs in Mexico
2017 establishments in Mexico
Querétaro F.C.